Naif Al-Mousa  (born 21 November 1986) is a Saudi Arabian footballer who currently plays as a left-back for Bisha.

References

 

1986 births
Living people
Saudi Arabian footballers
Al-Shabab FC (Riyadh) players
Al-Hazem F.C. players
Al-Taawoun FC players
Bisha FC players
Saudi First Division League players
Saudi Professional League players
Saudi Second Division players
Association football fullbacks